Farhana Afzal (born 11 March 1964) is a Pakistani politician who was a Member of the Provincial Assembly of the Punjab, from 2008 to May 2018.

Early life and education
She was born on 11 March 1964 in Sargodha.

She graduated in 1982 from Kinnaird College for Women University and earned a Bachelor of Arts.

Political career

She was elected to the Provincial Assembly of the Punjab as a candidate of Pakistan Muslim League (Q) on a reserved seat for women in 2008 Pakistani general election.

She was re-elected to the Provincial Assembly of the Punjab as a candidate of Pakistan Muslim League (N) on a reserved seat for women in 2013 Pakistani general election.

References

Living people
Punjab MPAs 2013–2018
1964 births
Pakistan Muslim League (N) politicians
Punjab MPAs 2008–2013
Women members of the Provincial Assembly of the Punjab
21st-century Pakistani women politicians